Newton Investment Management is a investment management firm based in London. It is subsidiary of BNY Mellon Investment Management.

History 
The firm was founded as Newton in 1978 as a joint venture with Scottish insurance broker Reed Stonehouse. In 1986, it was acquired by alexander & alexander and was renamed to Newton Investment Management. In 1992, the firm did a management buyout of alexander & alexander's stake. In 1994, it acquired Capital House group of companies from the Royal Bank of Scotland, with the bank acquiring a 33% interest in Newton Investment Management.

In 1998, Mellon Bank (now BNY Mellon) acquired 75% of Newton Investment Management for $277 million and in 2002, acquired the remaining interest.

References

Investment companies of the United Kingdom
BNY Mellon